The Second Mrs. Burton is an American radio soap opera, broadcast daily five days a week on CBS Radio from January 7, 1946,  to March 23, 1960. It was the final serial broadcast on a national radio network, after The Right to Happiness, Ma Perkins, and Young Doctor Malone.

Plot
The three main characters of the show were the wealthy Stan Burton, his mother, and his wife Terry (the second Mrs. Burton of the show's title). The action was driven by the Burtons' interactions with their extended family, neighbors, and church. It was one of the first radio shows to openly address the topic of divorce and remarriage.

Cast
Terry Burton—Sharon Douglas, Claire Niesen, Patsy Campbell, Jan Miner, Teri Keane
Stan Burton—Gale Gordon, Gary Merrill, Dwight Weist
Mother Burton—Evelyn Varden, Charme Allen, Ethel Owen
Marian Burton Sullivan—Anne Stone, Joan Alexander, Cathleen Cordell
Brad Burton—Dix Davis, Karl Weber, Ben Cooper, Larry Robinson
Marcia Burton Archer—Alice Frost
Lew Archer—Larry Haines
Lillian Anderson—Elspeth Eric
Jim Anderson—King Calder
Reverend Cornwell—Bartlett Robinson
Don Cornwell—Robert Readick

Production
The Second Mrs. Burton originally aired between 1941 and 1943 on CBS West Coast stations (airing as early as 7 February 1941), written by John M. Young, and featuring Sharon Douglas, Gale Gordon, and Ann Stone. The series premiered nationally in 1946, again written by John M. Young, and starring Claire Niesen and Gary Merrill. In March 1946, Dwight Weist replaced Merrill as the voice of Stan Burton, and would continue in the role until the end of the series. Patsy Campbell joined the series as Stan's sister "Louisa" in late January 1946, eventually taking over the leading role of Terry Burton from Niesen in October 1947 "due to a change in characterization" by new writer, Martha Alexander

References

External links
The Second Mrs. Burton radio scripts (1952–1960) at the New York Public Library Archive
The Second Mrs. Burton radio scripts  (1946–1947) at the Cornell University Library

1946 radio programme debuts
1960 radio programme endings
1940s American radio programs
1950s American radio programs
American radio soap operas
CBS Radio programs